Eierdiebe (The Family Jewels in United States) is a 2003 German comedy-drama film written and directed by Robert Schwentke. The film deals with testicular cancer, which Schwentke suffered through and survived.

External links

2003 films
2003 comedy-drama films
German comedy-drama films
Films directed by Robert Schwentke
Films scored by Martin Todsharow
Films about cancer
2000s German films